USS Two Sisters was a small 54-ton captured Confederate schooner acquired by the Union Navy from the prize court during the American Civil War.

Two Sisters was put into service as a gunboat and, when required, as a ship's tender, by the Union Navy to patrol navigable waterways of the Confederacy to prevent the South from trading with other countries.

Service history 

Subsequently purchased by the Navy from the Prize Court at Key West, Florida, Two Sisters was commissioned on 30 January 1863 at Key West, Acting Master William A. Arthur in command. Assigned to the East Gulf Blockading Squadron, Two Sisters took her first prize on 1 February—seizing the sloop Richards off Boca Grande, Florida. On 30 April, the Union schooner captured the cotton-carrying blockade runner Agnes off the Tortugas, before taking the schooner Oliver S. Breese off Anclote Keys, Florida.

Two Sisters continued her patrols on the blockade through the spring, summer, and early fall, keeping a wary eye on the route between Bayport, Florida, and Havana, Cuba. On 15 October, she, and  assisted  in the capture of the Havana-bound British steamer Mail, which had attempted to run the blockade laden with cotton and turpentine. Bayport proved to be a good hunting ground. Two Sisters also captured the schooner Maria Alberta there on 27 November. On 13 January 1864, while Two Sisters was stationed off the mouth of the Suwannee River, a boat crew debarked from her and captured the schooner William with its cargo of salt, bagging, and rope. The Union schooner's patrol duty was broken in May by service as tender to the steam frigate . She then resumed independent blockade service through the onset of winter.

On 3 December 1864, Two Sisters participated in an early amphibious-type operation. Two Sisters subsequently remained on duty blockading the Florida coast for the duration of the Civil War. Two Sisters was sold in a public auction to J. Jones on 28 June 1865.

See also

Blockade runners of the American Civil War
Blockade mail of the Confederacy

References 

Ships of the Union Navy
Ships built in Baltimore
Schooners of the United States Navy
Gunboats of the United States Navy
Tenders of the United States Navy
American Civil War patrol vessels of the United States
1856 ships